was a Japanese daimyō of the mid-Edo period who ruled the Mito Domain. His childhood name was Tsuruchiyo (鶴千代).

Family
 Father: Tokugawa Munetaka
 Mother: Miyohime (1708-1746)
 Wife: Ikuko, daughter of Ichijo Kaneka
 Concubines:
 Sakakibara-dono
 Onoue no Kata
 Segawa-dono
 Mori-dono
 Iwakura-dono
 Miyake-dono
 Fukatsu-dono
 Children:
 Tokugawa Harumori (1751-1805) by Sakakibara
 Naojiro By Onoue
 Naonosuke by Onoue
 Katsugoro by Sakakibara
 Tokihime by Segawa married Matsudaira Yoshisuke of Takasu Domain 
 Matsudaira Yorisuke (1756-1839) of Shishido Domain by Segawa
 Matsudaira Yoriyuki by Mori
 Yoshihime married Nijo Harutaka by Iwakura
 Kunihime married Imadegawa Sanetane by Iwakura
 Minehime become nun by Iwakura
 2 sons by Miyake
 Nakayama Nobutaka (1765-1820) by Miyake
 Kinhime become nun by Fukatsu

Ancestry

Reference

References

 Nekhet's "World Nobility" page on the Mito-Tokugawa

1728 births
1766 deaths
Lords of Mito